The Canal du Clignon is a canal in northern France connecting Canal de l'Ourcq in Neufchelles to Montigny-l'Allier.

See also
 List of canals in France

References

Canals in France
Canals opened in 1841